Delaware City Local School District is a public school district serving students in the city of Delaware, Ohio, United States. The school district enrolls about 5,650 students as of the 2021–2022 academic year. The Frank B. Willis Education Center (formerly the Intermediate School and High School) is home to the administrative offices of the district.

Administration
The district is led by the Superintendent and the DCS Board of Education. The Superintendent is appointed by the Board and runs the district's day-to-day operations. As of August 1, 2019, Heidi Kegley is the district's superintendent. Members of the Board are elected to 4 year terms by the citizens of the district. Each school year, a senior at Hayes High School is appointed by the school's principal to serve on the Board for the duration of the school year. While this student does not have voting powers on the Board, they do serve as a voice for the students of the district. The 2021–2022 academic year Student Board Member is Katie Hejmanowski.

Board of Education 

 Ted Backus
 Jayna McDaniel-Browning, Vice President
 Melissa Harris
 Matt Weller
 Michael Wiener, President
 Katie Hejmanowski, Student Board Member

Schools

Elementary schools
Ervin Carlisle Elementary School (Grades K through 5th)
James Conger Elementary School (Grades PreK through 5th)
Robert F. Schultz Elementary School (Grades K through 5th)
David Smith Elementary School (Grades K through 5th)
Laura Woodward Elementary School (Grades PreK through 5th)

Middle schools

John C. Dempsey Middle School (Grades 6th through 8th)

High schools
Rutherford B. Hayes High School (Grades 9th through 12th)

References

External links
Delaware City Local School District website

School districts in Ohio
Education in Delaware County, Ohio